London Buses route 48 was a Transport for London contracted bus route in London, England. It ran between Walthamstow bus station and London Bridge bus station, and was operated by Arriva London.

History
Route 48 was introduced in September 1968.

In February 2017, operation of the route transferred from Stagecoach London to Arriva London.

In June 2018, campaigners claimed to be aware of plans to withdraw the route, despite no official announcement from Transport for London. In August, documents were leaked that discussed the closure. In October 2018, Transport for London held a consultation on proposals to withdraw the route and extend route 55 to Walthamstow. In April 2019, Transport for London confirmed it would go ahead with plans to withdraw the route as part of proposals that would save it £2.5 million per year.

The route was withdrawn on 12 October 2019.

References 

Bus routes in London